Bökhmörön is a sum (district) of Uvs Province in western Mongolia.

It is situated in the Achit Nuur lake depression, sum center is 20 km NW from lake at the top part of Bökhmörön river delta. Eastern part of the sum is situated in Kharkhiraa-Türgen mountains SW of lake Üüreg Lake. The sum is on the border of Mongolia and Russia in the west it borders to Bayan-Ölgii Province.

Khotgor coal mine is in the eastern part of the sum.

Populated places in Mongolia
Districts of Uvs Province